Collin County is located in the U.S. state of Texas. It is part of the Dallas-Fort Worth-Arlington metropolitan statistical area, and a small portion of the city of Dallas is in the county. At the 2020 United States census, the county's population is 1,064,465, making it the sixth-most populous county in Texas and the 43rd-largest county by population in the United States. Its county seat is McKinney.

History
Both the county and the county seat were named after Collin McKinney (1766-1861), one of the five men who drafted the Texas Declaration of Independence and the oldest of the 59 men who signed it.

Geography

Lakes 
 Lavon Lake

Major highways

Adjacent counties
 Grayson County (north)
 Fannin County (northeast)
 Hunt County (east)
 Rockwall County (southeast)
 Dallas County (south)
 Denton County (west)

Communities

Cities (shared with other counties)

 Carrollton (mostly in Dallas and Denton counties)
 Celina (small part in Denton County)
 Dallas (mostly in Dallas County with small parts in Denton, Kaufman, Rockwall and Collin counties)
 Frisco (partly in Denton County)
 Garland (mostly in Dallas County and a small part in Rockwall County)
 Josephine (small part in Hunt County)
 Plano (small part in Denton County)
 Prosper (partly in Denton County)
 Richardson (mostly in Dallas County)
 Royse City (mostly in Rockwall County and partly Hunt County)
 Sachse (mostly in Dallas County)
 Van Alstyne (mostly in Grayson County)
 Wylie (small parts in Rockwall and Dallas counties)

Cities

 Allen
 Anna
 Blue Ridge
 Celina
 Farmersville
 Lavon
 Lowry Crossing
 Lucas
 McKinney (County Seat)
 Melissa
 Murphy
 Nevada
 Parker
 Princeton
 Weston

Towns
 Fairview
 Hebron (mostly in Denton County)
 New Hope
 St. Paul
Prosper

Census-designated places
 Seis Lagos
 Westminster

Unincorporated communities

 Altoga
 Arnold
 Beverly Hill
 Bloomdale
 Branch
 Buckner
 Chambersville
 Chambliss
 Clear Lake
 Climax
 Collin
 Copeville
 Cowley
 Culleoka
 Deep Water Point Estates
 Desert
 Fayburg
 Forest Grove
 Frognot
 Kelly
 Lavon Beach Estates
 Lavon Shores Estates
 Little Ridge
 Marilee
 Milligan
 Millwood
 New Mesquite
 Pebble Beach Sunset Acres
 Pecan Grove
 Pike
 Rhea Mills
 Rockhill
 Roland
 Sedalia
 Snow Hill
 Trinity Park
 Valdasta
 Verona
 Walnut Grove
 Wetsel
 Winningkoff
 Yucote Acres

Historical communities
 Lebanon00
 Kiamba, Texas
 Lolaville
 Renner
 Shepton

Ghost towns
 Biggers
 Nickelville
 Parris

Demographics

In 2000, the U.S. Census Bureau determined 491,675 people resided in Collin County. With the economic and population growth of the Dallas–Fort Worth metroplex, its population increased to 1,064,465 at the 2020 U.S. census. The population density as of 2019 was 1,229.8 people per square mile. Among the population, its median age was 37.3, up from the statewide median age of 35.1. Linguistically, 11.6% of the county spoke Spanish as their household language, followed by Asian and Pacific Islander languages. Altogether 29.7% of Collin County spoke a language other than English at home, contributed in part by its large foreign-born population which made up 22% of the population according to 2019 estimates from the American Community Survey.

The median income for a household in the county as of 2019 was $96,134, up from $70,835 in 2000. Families had a median household income of $113,471, married-couple families $127,575, and non-family households $53,986. An estimated 6.3% of Collin County's residents lived at or below the poverty line from 2014 to 2019. In 2000, about 3.30% of families and 4.90% of the population lived at or below the poverty line, including 5.10% of those under age 18 and 7.10% of those aged 65 and older.

Of its residential properties, the median value of an owner-occupied housing unit was $354,100 in 2019, with a total of 8% of owner-occupied housing units ranging from less than $100,000 up to $200,000. In 2007, Collin County was ranked No. 21 for high property taxes in the U.S. as percentage of the homes' value on owner-occupied housing. It also tanked in the top 100 for amount of property taxes paid and for percentage of taxes of income. Part is this is due to the Robin Hood plan school financing system in Texas.

Race and ethnicity 

Note: the U.S. Census Bureau treats Hispanic/Latino as an ethnic category. This table excludes Latinos from the racial categories and assigns them to a separate category. Hispanics/Latinos can be of any race.

At the 2000 census, the racial and ethnic makeup of the county was 81.39% White, 4.79% Black or African American, 0.47% Native American, 6.92% Asian, 0.05% Pacific Islander, 4.26% from other races, and 2.11% from two or more races; 10.27% of the population were Hispanic or Latino American of any race. In 2019, the American Community Survey estimated its non-Hispanic white population now represented 55%, reflecting a national demographic trend of diversification. The Black or African American population grew to 10%, Asian Americans made up 16% of the population, and Hispanic or Latino Americans increased to 16% of the total population in 2019; multiracial Americans made up an estimated 2% of the county population. The largest European ancestry groups from 2014 to 2019 were Germans, English Americans, and Irish and Italian Americans. By the publication of the 2020 census, the racial and ethnic makeup of Collin County was 50.96% non-Hispanic white, 10.16% Black or African American, 0.36% American Indian or Alaska Native, 17.70% Asian, 0.06% Pacific Islander, 0.46% some other race, 4.41% multiracial, and 15.89% Hispanic or Latino American of any race.

Religion 
Christianity has historically been the predominant religious affiliation among the county's residents as part of the Bible Belt. According to the 2020 Public Religion Research Institute study, non-Christian religions are present and have been growing, largely due to migration into the county; among the non-Christian population, 3% were Hindu, 2% Muslim and 2% Jewish. Overall among its Christian population, Baptists, Methodists, Catholics and non- or inter-denominational Christians have been prominent.

Government, courts, and politics

Government 

Collin County, like all counties in Texas, is governed by a Commissioners Court. The court is chaired by a county judge (equivalent to a county executive in other states) who is elected county-wide, and four commissioners who are elected by the voters in each of four precincts.

County Judge & Commissioners

County Officials

Justices of the Peace

Politics 
Since the 1960s, Collin County has consistently supported Republican candidates in presidential and congressional elections. The last Democrat to win the county was Lyndon Johnson in 1964. In 2020, Collin County had become a political bellwether. Despite this, Republicans continue to win most state legislative districts in the county.

United States House of Representatives

Texas State Representatives

Texas State Senators

State Board of Education member

Education

K-12 education
The following school districts lie entirely within Collin County:
 Allen Independent School District
 Anna Independent School District
 Farmersville Independent School District
 Lovejoy Independent School District
 McKinney Independent School District
 Melissa Independent School District
 Plano Independent School District
 Princeton Independent School District
 Wylie Independent School District

The following districts lie partly within the county:
 Bland Independent School District (very small part only)
 Blue Ridge Independent School District
 Celina Independent School District
 Community Independent School District
 Frisco Independent School District
 Gunter Independent School District (very small part)
 Leonard Independent School District (very small part only)
 Prosper Independent School District
 Rockwall Independent School District
 Royse City Independent School District
 Trenton Independent School District (very small part only)
 Van Alstyne Independent School District (very small part only)
 Whitewright Independent School District (very small part only)

In the 1990s Plano ISD received many non-Hispanic white families leaving urban areas. From circa 1997 and 2015 the number of non-Hispanic white children in K-12 schools in the county increased by 40,000 as part of a trend of white flight and suburbanization by non-Hispanic white families; however the same number of Plano ISD in particular decreased by 10,000 in that period.

Colleges and universities
Collin College opened its first campus on Highway 380 in McKinney in 1985. The college has grown to seven campuses/locations—two in McKinney and two in Plano and as well as Frisco, Allen, Rockwall, Wylie, Farmersville, and Celina. Collin College's official service area includes all of Collin County.

Dallas Baptist University also has an extension site in Frisco, DBU Frisco, as well as the University of North Texas's extension side, UNT Frisco. The majority of the University of Texas at Dallas campus in Richardson, Texas lies within Collin County.

Parks 

 Bratonia Park
 Myers Park
 Parkhill Prairie
 Sister Grove Park
 Trinity Trail
 Heard Natural Science Museum and Wildlife Sanctuary

Media 
Collin County is part of the Dallas/Fort Worth media market. Local media outlets are: KDFW-TV, KXAS-TV, WFAA-TV, KTVT-TV, KERA-TV, KTXA-TV, KDFI-TV, KDAF-TV, and KFWD-TV. Other nearby stations that provide coverage for Collin County come from the Sherman/Denison market and they include: KTEN-TV and KXII-TV.

Newspapers in the Collin County area include the Allen American, Celina Record, Farmersville Times, Frisco Enterprise, McKinney Courier-Gazette, and the Plano Star-Courier.  Nearby publications The Dallas Morning News and the Fort Worth Star-Telegram also provide news coverage of cities in the county.

Notable people

 Collin McKinney (1766-1861)  Politician, businessman, and co-author of the Texas Declaration of Independence
 Griff Barnett (1884-1958) Actor born in Blue Ridge
 Josh Blaylock (Born 1990) Actor and photographer born in Plano
 Samuel Bogart (1797-1861)
 Casey Dick (Born 1986) Football player born in Lucas
 Russell E. Dickenson (1923-2008) Park ranger born in Melissa
 Julie Doyle (Born 1996) Soccer player for Sky Blue FC (NWSL) born in Fairview
 Devin Duvernay (Born 1997) Football player for Baltimore Ravens born in Sachse
 King Fisher (1853-1884) Texas rancher and gunfighter born in Collin County
 James R. Gough (1860-1916) Texas State Senator born in Collin County
 Frank Shelby Groner (1877-1943) Lawyer, pastor, and educator born near Weston
 Aubrey Otis Hampton (1900-1955) Radiologist born in Copeville
 Warren Glenn Harding Sr. (1921-2005) Texas State Treasurer born in Princeton
 Jimmie C. Holland (1928-2017) Founder of the field of psycho-oncology, born in Nevada
 Sam Johnson (1930-2020) Politician who represented Collin County and Texas's 3rd District in US House of Representatives
 Kyler Murray (Born 1997) Football player for Arizona Cardinals from Allen
 Bumper Pool, Football player born in Lucas
 Jason Ralph (Born 1986), Actor born in McKinney
 James W. Throckmorton (1825-1894) 12th Governor of Texas, lived and is buried in McKinney

See also

 List of museums in North Texas
 National Register of Historic Places listings in Collin County, Texas
 Recorded Texas Historic Landmarks in Collin County

References

External links

 Collin County government's website
 1846 Plat of Buckner the first county seat of Collin County, from the Collin County Historical Society, hosted by the Portal to Texas History
 Life in Collin County 
 Collin County in Handbook of Texas Online at the University of Texas
 Collin Chronicles hosted by the Portal to Texas History
 Texas State Election History
 

 
1846 establishments in Texas
Populated places established in 1846
Dallas–Fort Worth metroplex counties